Czech Lion Award for Best Documentary is an award given to the best Czech documentary.

Winners

References 

Documentary film awards
Czech Lion Awards
Awards established in 2008